Mischief in the Air is a comedy mystery play from Max Afford. It was set in a radio station.

It was one of the few Australian plays of the 1940s to receive a professional production, being produced by J.C. Williamsons Ltd. They produced it in association with radio station 2GB and production company Macquarie, who presented a radio version.

Plot
Larry Carlson, an Australian soldier, meets American serviceman Clay Tuttle in New Guinea. When both are invalided out of the army they meet again in Sydney and try to purchase a radio station. They attempt to attract the interest of sponsors Mc McGuinness and Mr Mandelberg, but problems arise when the former falls dead.

Original cast
Aileen Britton
Edwin Finn
Edward Howell
John McCallum
John O'Malley

References

External links
Production details at AusStage
Mischief in the Air at AustLit
Complete text of play at Project Gutenberg
1944 plays
Australian plays